A police dog is a dog that is trained to assist police and other law enforcement officers. Their duties may include searching for drugs and explosives, locating missing people, finding crime scene evidence, protecting officers and other people, and attacking suspects who flee from or attack police officers. The most commonly used breeds are the German Shepherd, Belgian Malinois, Bloodhound, Dutch Shepherd, and the retriever family. In recent years, the Belgian Malinois has become the leading choice for police and military work due to their intense drive, focus, agility, and smaller size, though German Shepherds remain the breed most associated with law enforcement.

Police dogs are used on a federal and local level for law enforcement purposes, often assigned to a K-9 Unit with a specific handler, and must remember several verbal cues and hand gestures. Initial training for a police dog typically takes between eight months and a year, depending on where and how they are trained, and for what purpose. Police dogs often regularly take training programs with their assigned handler to reinforce their training. In many countries, intentionally injuring or killing a police dog is a criminal offense.

In some English-speaking countries, police dog units are referred to as K-9 or K9, which is a homophone upon the word canine.

History

Early history
Dogs have been used in law enforcement since the Middle Ages. Wealth and money was then tithed in the villages for the upkeep of the parish constable's bloodhounds that were used for hunting down outlaws. The first recorded use of police dogs were in the early 14th century in St. Malo, France, where dogs were used to guard docks and piers. By the late 14th century, bloodhounds were used in Scotland, known as "Slough dogs" – the word "Sleuth", (meaning detective) was derived from this. Between the 12th and 20th centuries, police dogs on the British Isles and European continent were primarily used for their tracking abilities.

The rapid urbanization of England and France in the 19th century increased public concern regarding growing lawlessness. In London, the existing law enforcement, the Bow Street Runners, struggled to contain the crime on their own, and as a result, private associations were formed to help combat crime. Night watchmen were employed to guard premises, and were provided with firearms and dogs to protect themselves from criminals.

Modern era

One of the first attempts to use dogs in policing was in 1889 by the Commissioner of the Metropolitan Police of London, Sir Charles Warren. Warren's repeated failures at identifying and apprehending the serial killer Jack the Ripper had earned him much vilification from the press, including being denounced for not using bloodhounds to track the killer. He soon had two bloodhounds trained for the performance of a simple tracking test from the scene of another of the killer's crimes. The results were far from satisfactory, with one of the hounds biting the Commissioner and both dogs later running off, requiring a police search to find them.

It was in Continental Europe that dogs were first used on a large scale. Police in Paris began using dogs against roaming criminal gangs at night, but it was the police department in Ghent, Belgium that introduced the first organized police dog service program in 1899. These methods soon spread to Austria-Hungary and Germany; in the latter the first scientific developments in the field took place with experiments in dog breeding and training. The German police selected the German Shepherd Dog as the ideal breed for police work and opened up the first dog training school in 1920 in Greenheide. In later years, many Belgian Malinois dogs were added to the unit. The dogs were systematically trained in obedience to their officers and tracking and attacking criminals. 

In Britain, the North Eastern Railway Police were among the first to use police dogs in 1908 to put a stop to theft from the docks in Hull. By 1910, railway police forces were experimenting with other breeds such as Belgian Malinois, Labrador Retrievers, and German shepherds.

Training 

Popular dog breeds used by law enforcement include the Airedale terrier, Akita, Groenendael, Malinois dog, Bernese Mountain Dog, Bloodhound, Border Collie, Boxer, Bouvier des Flandres, Croatian Sheepdog, Doberman Pinscher, German Shepherd, German Shorthaired Pointer, Golden Retriever, Labrador Retriever, Rottweiler and English Springer Spaniel.

Training of police dogs is a very lengthy process since it begins with the training of the canine handler. The canine handlers go through a long process of training to ensure that they will train the dog to the best of its ability. First, the canine handler has to complete the requisite police academy training and one to two years of patrol experience before becoming eligible to transfer to a specialty canine unit. This is because the experience as an officer allows prospective canine officers to gain valuable experience in law enforcement. However, having dog knowledge and training outside of the police academy is considered to be an asset, this could be dog obedience, crowd control, communicating effectively with animals and being approachable and personable since having a dog will draw attention from surrounding citizens.

For a dog to be considered for a police department, it must first pass a basic obedience training course. They must be able to obey the commands of their handler without hesitation. This allows the officer to have complete control over how much force the dog should use against a suspect. Dogs trained in Europe are usually given commands in the country's native language. Dogs are initially trained with this language for basic behavior, so, it is easier for the officer to learn new words/commands, rather than retraining the dog to new commands. This is contrary to the popular belief that police dogs are trained in a different language so that a suspect cannot command the dog against the officer.

Dogs used in law enforcement are trained to either be "single purpose" or "dual purpose". Single-purpose dogs are used primarily for backup, personal protection, and tracking. Dual-purpose dogs, however, are more typical. Dual-purpose dogs do everything that single-purpose dogs do, and also detect either explosives or narcotics. Dogs can only be trained for one or the other because the dog cannot communicate to the officer if it found explosives or narcotics. When a narcotics dog in the United States indicates to the officer that it found something, the officer has probable cause to search whatever the dog alerted on (i.e. bag or vehicle) without a warrant, in most states.

In suspect apprehension, having a loud barking dog is helpful and can result in suspects surrendering without delay.

Specialization 
Police dogs can be specialized to perform in specific areas.

Apprehension and attack dogs – This dog is used to locate, apprehend, and sometimes subdue suspects.
 Detection dogs – Trained to detect explosives or drugs such as marijuana, heroin, cocaine, crack cocaine, or methamphetamines. Some dogs are specifically trained to detect firearms and ammunition.
 Dual purpose dog – Also known as a patrol dog, these dogs are trained and skilled in tracking, handler protection, off-leash obedience, criminal apprehension, and article, area and building search.
 Search and rescue dogs (SAR) – This dog is used to locate suspects or find missing people or objects. Belgian Malinois, German Shepherds, Golden Retrievers, Labrador Retrievers, and Bloodhounds can all be used.

Retirement

Police dogs are retired if they become injured to an extent where they will not recover completely, pregnant or raising puppies, or are too old or sick to continue working. Since many dogs are raised in working environments for the first year of their life and retired before they become unable to perform, the working life of a dog is 6–9 years.

However, when police dogs retire in some countries they may have the chance to receive a pension plan for their contribution to policing. In 2013, a pension scheme for police dogs in Nottinghamshire, England was introduced, wherein the police force offered £805 over the span of three years to cover any additional medical costs; the dogs were also allowed to be adopted by their original handler.

In many countries, police dogs killed in the line of duty receive the same honors as their human partners.

Accusations of brutality and racial partiality
A 2020 investigation coordinated by the Marshall Project found evidence of widespread deployment of police dogs in the U.S. as disproportionate force and disproportionately against people of color. A series of 13 linked reports, found more than 150 cases from 2015 to 2020 of K-9 officers improperly using dogs as weapons to catch, bite and injure people. The rate of police K-9 bites in Baton Rouge, Louisiana, a majority-Black city of 220,000 residents, averages more than double that of the next-ranked city, Indianapolis, and nearly one-third of the police dog bites are inflicted on teenage men, most of whom are Black. Medical researchers found that police dog attacks are "more like shark attacks than nips from a family pet” due to the aggressive training police dogs undergo. Many people bitten were not violent and were not suspected of crimes. Police officers are often shielded from liability, and federal civil rights laws don’t typically cover bystanders who are bitten by mistake. Even when victims can bring cases, lawyers say they struggle because jurors tend to love police dogs.

Usage by country and region

Australia
The Australian Federal Police employ "general purpose" police dogs, whose duties include searching for missing persons, suspect apprehension, and keeping the peace. The Australian Federal Police also employ police dogs trained for specialized purposes, such as detecting firearms, explosives, illegal narcotics, and currency. The Australian Border Force also utilizes detector dogs to search for concealed people or illegal products at border checkpoints.

Bangladesh
Border Guards Bangladesh, Rapid Action Battalion and the Dhaka Metropolitan Police maintain several dog squads to assist in anti-narcotic and anti-bombing campaigns.

Belgium
The Belgian Canine Support Group is part of the country's federal police. It has 35 dog teams, most of which are Belgian Malinois. Some dogs are trained to detect drugs, human remains, hormones or fire accelerants. About a third are tracker dogs trained to find or identify living people. These teams are often deployed to earthquake areas to locate people trapped in collapsed buildings.  The federal police's explosive detector dogs are attached to the Federal Police Special Units.

Canada

Canadians started using police dogs occasionally in 1908. However, they used privately owned dogs until 1935 when the Royal Canadian Mounted Police (RCMP) saw the value of police dogs and created the first team in 1937. By the 1950s, the RCMP had German Shepherds, Schnauzers, and Doberman Pinschers in service.

Many Canadian municipalities use dog squads as a means of tracking suspects. Most municipalities in Canada employ the bite and hold technique rather than the bark and hold technique meaning once the dog is deployed, it bites the suspect until the dog handler commands it to release. This often results in serious puncture wounds and is traumatic for suspects. A dog has the legal status of property in Canada. As such, developing case law is moving towards absolute liability for the handlers of animals deliberately released to intentionally maim suspects. The dog is effectively a weapon.

In 2010, an Alberta Court of Queen's Bench judge stayed criminal charges against Kirk Steele, a man who was near-fatally shot by a police officer while he stabbed the officer's police dog. The judge found that the shooting was cruel and unusual treatment and excessive force.

Police require reasonable suspicion they will recover evidence in order to use a dog to sniff a person or their possessions in public. This is because using a dog to detect scents is considered a search. The main exemption to that rule are the dogs of the Canada Border Services Agency who are allowed to make searches without warrants under s.98 of the Customs Act.

In 2017, it was reported that the Canadian forces had approximately 170 RCMP dog teams across Canada, and was continuing to grow as more and more Canadian municipalities saw the value of police dogs.

Denmark
There are a total of 240 active police dogs in Denmark, each of which are ranked in one of three groups: Group 1, Group 2 and Group 3. Dogs in Group 1 are very experienced, and highly trained. Group 1 dogs are typically within the age range of four to eight years old and are used for patrolling, rescue, searching for biological evidence and major crime investigations. Group 2 dogs are employed for the same tasks as members of Group 1, but they do not participate in major crime investigations or searching for biological evidence. Group 3 is the beginner rank for police dogs, and are only employed for patrol operations.

Hong Kong

The Police Dog Unit (PDU) was established in 1949 and is a specialist force of the Hong Kong Police under the direct command of the Special Operations Bureau. Their roles are crowd control, search and rescue, and poison and explosive detection. In addition, the PDU works in collaboration with other departments for anti-crime operations.

Netherlands
The Dutch  Police Dog Brigade is part of the national police corps national unit, and supports other units with specially trained dogs. The  dogs are trained to recognize a single specific scent. They specialize in identifying scents (identifying the scent shared by an object and a person), narcotics, explosives and firearms, detecting human remains, and locating drowning people and fire accelerants.

The 10 regional units also have dog brigades of their own. For example, the canine unit of the regional police East netherlands.

India
In India, the National Security Guard inducted the Belgian Malinois into its K-9 Unit, Border Security Force, and Central Reserve Police Force use Rajapalayam as guard dogs to support the Force on the borders of Kashmir. 

For regional security, the Delhi Police has recruited many of the city's street dogs to be trained for security purposes. The Bengal Police uses German Shepherds, Labrador Retrievers, and the Indian pariah dog in its bomb-sniffing squad.

Israel 
Israel utilizes canine units for border patrols to track illegal persons or objects that pose a threat. Police dogs serve in the Israel Police and Israel Prison Service.

Italy

All the law enforcement in Italy (Carabinieri, Polizia di Stato and Guardia di Finanza) have in service many patrol dogs for Public Order, Anti-Drug, Anti-explosive, Search and Rescue. The first train centers for police dogs in Italy were established after World War I and in 1924, Italy purchased German Shepherds from Germany for border patrol operations in the Alps. The Carabinieri Kennel Club was formed in 1957 to produce police dogs and train handlers in Italy. German and Belgian shepherds are used for multiple purposes, Labradors for drug, weapons and explosive surveillance and Rottweilers serve for protection.

Japan 
Japan is one of the few east Asian countries that have dogs serving in law enforcement as others dislike dogs due to cultural norms. Between the 16th and 19th centuries, samurai had Akita service companions that would defend samurai while they slept at night. In modern times, the German shepherd is the common police dog of the Tokyo Metropolitan Police Department.

Kenya 
Police dogs began their service in Kenya in 1948 as part of the Kenya Police Criminal Investigation Department of the Kenya Police. Since the 1950s, the main police dog in service is the German shepherd, with Labradors, Rottweilers and English Springer Spaniels being used for specialized purposes. Since the 2000s, the Kenya Police has increased the breeding and adoption of police dogs with the long-term goal of having canines serving in each police station of Kenya.

Nepal 
The Nepal Police first established a canine unit in 1975 due to increased crime rates and to help with investigations. Since then, police dogs are in service throughout various regions of Nepal and have been present at the Tribhuwan International Airport since 2009.

Pakistan
Pakistan Customs uses a K-9 unit for anti-smuggling operations. Pakistan's Sindh Police also have a specialized K-9 unit.

Peru 

Peru recruits various canine units for various governmental, military and police operations. The National Service of Agrarian Health (SENASA) of the Ministry of Agriculture and Irrigation has the Canine Brigade of Plant Health that detects plants that may violate phytosanitary trade practices and to prevent the contraband importation of pests in plants and fruit. The brigade is present at Jorge Chávez International Airport and in Peruvian territory.

For the National Police of Peru, they prefer the German Shepherd, Belgian Shepherd Malinois, Beagle, Weimaraner, Golden Retriever and Labrador Retriever breeds for their service and accept donations of dogs between the ages of 12 and 24 months. The National Police use canine units for drug surveillance in the country's main airport, Jorge Chávez International Airport, with the force receiving canine training from United States Customs and Border Protection.

The Peruvian Army has canine units trained for search and rescue as well as disaster situations. During the COVID-19 pandemic in Peru, a limitation of gatherings and curfew was enforced with the assistance of canine units that served for law enforcement.

Russia
Police dogs have been used in Russia since 1909 in Saint Petersburg. Attack dogs are used commonly by police and are muzzled at all times unless ordered to apprehend a suspect. Police dogs have also been used to track fugitives, which has remained common in most Soviet Union Successor States.

Sweden

The Swedish Police Authority currently deploys around 400 police canines. There is however no requirement for the dogs to be purebred, as long as they meet mental and physical requirements set by the police. Dogs aged 18–48 months are eligible to take admission tests for the K9 training. The police dogs live with their operators, and after retirement at age 8–10 the operator often assumes the ownership of the dog.

United Kingdom

Police forces across the country, as well as the RAF Police, employ dogs and handlers and dog training schools are available to cater for the ever-increasing number of dogs being used. The use of police dogs became popular in the 1930s when Scotland Yard officially added dogs to its police force.

There are over 2,500 police dogs employed amongst the various police forces in the UK, with the Belgian Malinois as the most popular breed for general purpose work. In 2008, a Belgian Malinois female handled by PC Graham Clarke won the National Police Dog Trials with the highest score ever recorded.

All British police dogs, irrespective of the discipline they are trained in, must be licensed to work operationally. To obtain the licence they have to pass a test at the completion of their training, and then again every year until they retire, which is usually at about the age of 8. The standards required to become operational are laid down by the Association of Chief Police Officers (ACPO) sub-committee on police dogs and are reviewed on a regular basis to ensure that training and licensing reflects the most appropriate methods and standards.

United States

Police dogs are in widespread use across the United States. Police dogs are operated on the federal, state, county, and local levels and are used for a wide variety of duties, similar to those of other nations. Their duties generally include detecting illegal narcotics, explosives, and other weapons, search-and-rescue, and cadaver searches. The most common breeds for everyday duties are the German Shepherd and the Belgian Malinois, though other breeds may be used to perform specific tasks.

On the federal level, police dogs may be seen in some airports assisting Transportation Security Administration officials search for explosives and weapons, or by Customs and Border Protection searching for concealed narcotics and people. Some dogs may also be used by tactical components of such agencies as the Bureau of Alcohol, Tobacco, Firearms, and Explosives, the Federal Bureau of Investigation, and the United States Marshals Service. Federally owned police dogs play a vital role in homeland security. An expert on police dogs, L. Paul Waggoner of the Canine Performance Sciences Program at Auburn University said, "detector dogs are a critical component of national security – and they also provide a very visible and proven deterrent to terrorist activities." The American Kennel Club estimates that between 80–90 percent of dogs purchased by the U.S. Department of Homeland Security and U.S. Department of Defense come from foreign vendors, mostly located in Europe.

Most police agencies in the United States – whether state, county, or local – use police dogs as means of law enforcement. Often, even the smallest of departments operates a K-9 division of at least one dog; in these cases, police dogs will usually serve all purposes deemed necessary, most commonly suspect apprehension and narcotics detection, and teams are often on call. In larger cities and metropolitan areas, police departments regularly employ dozens of police dogs. In these cases, individual dogs often serve individual purposes in which each particular animal is specialized, and teams usually serve scheduled shifts. In both cases, police dogs are almost always cared for by their specific handlers. The U.S. Fish and Wildlife Services agency requires police dogs to undergo annual in-service training to recertify their skills and credentials. This training must last at least 24 hours each year.

Under the Federal Law Enforcement Animal Protection Act, it is a felony to assault or kill a law enforcement animal, including police dogs and police horses, in all 50 states. However, police dogs are not treated as police officers for the purpose of the law, and attacking or killing a police dog is not punishable in the same manner as attacking or killing a human police officer. Although many police departments formally swear dogs in as police officers, this swearing-in is purely honorary, and carries no legal significance.

Police dogs also play a major role in American penal systems. Many jails and prisons will use special dog teams as a means of intervening in large-scale fights or riots by inmates. Also, many penal systems will employ dogs – usually bloodhounds – in searching for escaped prisoners.

In October 2017, the U.S. House Oversight and Government Reform Intergovernmental Affairs Subcommittee held a hearing about whether there is a sufficient supply of dogs that can be trained as police dogs. Congressman Mike Rogers (R-AL) said that the continued ISIS-inspired attacks in the U.S. and all over the world "have driven demand through the roof" for police dogs.

The Marshall Project maintains a database of police dog bites across the United States.

Supreme Court cases 

The United States Supreme Court is the highest federal court in the United States of America. Some U.S. Supreme Court cases that pertain to police dogs are:
 United States v. Place (1983) – The Court determined that the sniffing of a person's personal items in a public place for the purpose of finding illegal narcotics was not considered a "search" under the Fourth Amendment. Further, the sniff of a dog is sui generis and is considered "uniquely pervasive".
 City of Indianapolis v. Edmond (2000) – The Court determined that is unconstitutional to set up a highway checkpoint to for the primary purpose of illegal narcotic discovery. In the case, the Indianapolis Police Department was using police dogs to detect narcotics at the checkpoint without reasonable suspicion.
 Illinois v. Caballes (2005) – The Court determined that police do not need probable cause to bring a drug-detection dog to a vehicle during a legal traffic stop. Further, a search by a police dog does not count as an invasion of privacy, because a well-trained one will only alert to the presence of illegal substances.
 Florida v. Harris (2013) – The Court affirmed that a police dog's alert to the exterior of a vehicle gives the officer probable cause to search the vehicle without a warrant. Further, the Court affirmed that the state does not have to prove each dog's reliability in order for evidence gathered from them to be valid in court.
 Florida v. Jardines (2013) – The Court determined that evidence collected from a police dog at the front door of a house cannot be used in court. The front porch of a house is considered a private place, and the police need probable cause and a search warrant to bring a police dog to the front door.
 Rodriguez v. United States (2015) – The Court determined that, without reasonable suspicion, the use of a police dog after the conclusion of a legal traffic stop violates the Fourth Amendment.

See also

 Detection dog
 Dogs in warfare
 Nosework
 Working dog

References

Bibliography

External links

 National Police Canine Association (US)
 United States Police Canine Association
 The North American Police Work Dog Association
 Los Angeles County Police Canine Association US
 Virginia Police Canine Association US
 American Working Dog Association

 
Working dogs
Dog, Police